Heritage High School is a high school in Brentwood, California, United States. It opened on August 1, 2005, with a freshman and sophomore class. The school grew every year until it reached the capacity of all four classes (freshman, sophomore, junior, and senior) in 2008. The Heritage High School class of 2008 was the highest grade each year it was at Heritage, and was its first graduating class.

The school features include a state-of-the-art theatre, recording studio, broadcast studio (with green screen), and large rear projection screen TVs in every classroom.  Its colors are gold, Columbia blue, and white, and its mascot is the Patriot. It was recently credited with the six-year status highest API score in the district.

SLCs
The school is separated into four Small Learning Communities (SLCs), SLC-A1, SLC-A2, SLC-B, SLC-C, and SLC-D. SLC-A and SLC-D were the only SLCs open the first year of school, but the second school year saw the beginning of SLC-B, with SLC-C being partially used for PE teachers, and by 2007 it was being used completely. The Class of 2008 was the first class to graduate from Heritage High School, and the Class of 2009 was the first to have attended Heritage for all four years.

As of 2019, all four SLCs are being used and have been staffed with assistant principals. The staffing is as follows:

 SLC A — Danielle Winford, Assistant Principal
 SLC B — Julene MacKinnon, Assistant Principal
 SLC C — Hugh Bursch, Assistant Principal
 SLC D — Chris Lonakar,  Assistant Principal

Academies
In addition to Heritage's Small Learning Communities, the school also features four academies, which students can join to pursue an interest in a particular field of study.  The four academies are:
 Law, Government, and Public Service
 Engineering Technologies
 Health and Recreation
 Environmental Science

Sports
The school is home to sports teams called the Patriots.  Numerous sports compete in the North Coast Section Championships. Players and students come together and watch the teams compete. The Heritage 6th man also was nominated and won the title as the Best Sixth Man of the Year in the Bay Area.

Clubs
Extra-curricular activities, known as clubs, at Heritage include one of the best known drama/theater programs in the state after its production of Oliver in 2009 and Hairspray in 2012, band, Mock Trials, The Law Government and public Service Club, Model UN, Interact, Science Olympiad, Martial Arts Club, Math Club, Robotics Club, Asian Art Club, Harry Potter Club, Music Club, Filipino Club, Latinos Unitos Club, and a Leadership/Student Council.

Notable alumni
 Paul Blackburn, professional baseball player with the Oakland Athletics

References

External links
Heritage High School webpage

High schools in Contra Costa County, California
Brentwood, California
Public high schools in California
Educational institutions established in 2005
2005 establishments in California